The following radio stations broadcast on FM frequency 89.1 MHz:

Argentina 
 Antena Libre in General Roca, Río Negro
 Universidad in San Justo, Buenos Aires
 Universo in San Nicolás de los Arroyos, Buenos Aires
 Uno in Concordia, Entre Ríos
 Del Sol in Viedma, Río Negro
 Estación Vinilo in Mar del Plata, Buenos Aires
 Radio María (Argentina) in Rosario, Santa Fe
 Imágenes in San Salvador, Entre Rios
 Orion in Salliqueló, Buenos Aires
 Radio María in Dolores, Buenos Aires
 Radio María in San Pedro de Jujuy, Jujuy
 Radio María in Rosario, Santa Fe
 Records in Comodoro Rivadavia, Chubut
 Sol in Rosario, Santa Fe
 STOP in Paraná, Entre Ríos
 Tiempo in Villa Mercedes, San Luis
 Bariloche in San Carlos de Bariloche, Río Negro
 Zoe in Chaco

Australia 
 89.1 Radio Blue Mountains in Katoomba, New South Wales
 4KRY in Kingaroy, Queensland
 5BBB in Adelaide, South Australia

Bermuda
ZBM-FM

Canada (Channel 206) 
 CBFY-FM in Ville-Marie, Quebec
 CBHC-FM in Truro, Nova Scotia
 CBK-FM-1 in Prince Albert, Saskatchewan
 CBLA-FM-2 in Paris, Ontario
 CBLG-FM in Geraldton, Ontario
 CBNF-FM in Bonne Bay, Newfoundland and Labrador
 CBSI-FM-3 in Churchill Falls, Newfoundland and Labrador
 CFNQ-FM in Natashquan, Quebec
 CFOU-FM in Trois-Rivieres, Quebec
 CHSD-FM in Squamish, British Columbia
 CHUO-FM in Ottawa, Ontario
 CISO-FM in Orillia, Ontario
 CJBR-FM in Rimouski, Quebec
 CKRL-FM in Quebec City, Quebec
 CKYY-FM in Welland, Ontario
 CKSB-9-FM in Fort Frances, Ontario
 VF8006 in Piopolis, Quebec

China 
 Beijing Story Radio in Beijing
 CNR The Voice of China in Dalian and Nanchang
 CRI Voice of the South China Sea in Sanya

Japan
 AFN Okinawa Wave 89

Mexico
 XHAVR-FM in Alvarado, Veracruz
 XHCAH-FM in Cacahoatán, Chiapas
 XHCAO-FM in Ciudad Camargo, Tamaulipas
 XHCARH-FM in Cardonal, Hidalgo
 XHCEA-FM in Los Reyes de Salgado, Michoacán
 XHCPBG-FM in Santa María Ocotán, Durango
 XHCSAO-FM in San Felipe, Baja California
 XHEFG-FM in Celaya (El Puesto), Guanajuato
 XHEHF-FM in Nogales, Sonora
 XHENR-FM in Nueva Rosita, Coahuila
 XHEPF-FM in Ensenada, Baja California
 XHETB-FM in Gómez Palacio, Durango
 XHGDA-FM in Guadalajara, Jalisco
 XHIKE-FM in Salina Cruz, Oaxaca
 XHITG-FM in Tuxtla Gutiérrez, Chiapas
 XHLUP-FM in Compostela, Nayarit
 XHNTA-FM in Santa Ana, Sonora
 XHPEFK-FM in Hidalgo Del Parral, Chihuahua
 XHPMQ-FM in Puerto Morelos, Quintana Roo
 XHPSJC-FM in San José del Cabo, Baja California Sur
 XHRHV-FM in Chalma, Veracruz
 XHXM-FM in Jerez, Zacatecas
 XHZTM-FM in Zitácuaro, Michoacán

Philippines (Channel 206)
  - defunct, Metro Manila
  in Metro Manila
  in Cebu City
  in Davao City
  in Legazpi City

South Korea
HLKC-FM in Seoul

United Kingdom

England
BBC Radio 2 at Wrotham, Kent

United States (Channel 206) 
 KADV in Garberville, California
 KAGP in Greenwood, Texas
 KANO in Hilo, Hawaii
  in Albuquerque, New Mexico
  in Sioux Falls, South Dakota
 KAVY in McCall, Idaho
 KAWS (FM) in Marsing, Idaho
  in Santa Rosa, California
  in Spearfish, South Dakota
 KBTD in Freer, Texas
  in Brush, Colorado
  in Provo, Utah
  in Atherton, California
 KCFH in Two Harbors, California
  in Livingston, California
  in Saint Charles, Missouri
 KCRU in Oxnard, California
 KDAI (FM) in Scottsbluff, Nebraska
  in La Junta, Colorado
 KEOS in College Station, Texas
  in Richland, Washington
  in Blanchard, Louisiana
 KGFN in Goldfield, Nevada
 KGHE in Montesano, Washington
 KGLZ in East Helena, Montana
  in Chico, California
 KHJM in Dexter, Missouri
  in Hastings, Nebraska
 KHOI in Story City, Iowa
 KHOL in Jackson, Wyoming
 KHUI in Alamosa, Colorado
 KJKL in Jamestown, North Dakota
 KJZX-LP in Austin, Texas
 KKLB in Bartlesville, Oklahoma
 KLBF in Lincoln, North Dakota
  in Reedsport, Oregon
 KLPI in Ruston, Louisiana
 KLVK (FM) in Fountain Hills, Arizona
  in Casper, Wyoming
  in Gresham, Oregon
 KMJB in Hudson, Wyoming
 KMUW in Wichita, Kansas
 KNNZ in Hawley, Minnesota
 KNSJ in Descanso, California
 KNSZ in Ottumwa, Iowa
 KNWT in Cody, Wyoming
  in Barstow, California
 KPGT in Watertown, South Dakota
  in Bakersfield, California
  in Postville, Iowa
  in Roswell, New Mexico
 KQFZ-FM in Valley View, Texas
 KQOU in Clinton, Oklahoma
  in Stephenville, Texas
 KRFF in Fairbanks, Alaska
 KRLR in Sulphur, Louisiana
 KSJM (FM) in St. James, Minnesota
 KSMF in Ashland, Oregon
 KSPP in Rhinelander, Wisconsin
 KSQX in Springtown, Texas
 KSRP in Dodge City, Kansas
 KSTX in San Antonio, Texas
 KTIM in Ellinger, Texas
  in Canon City, Colorado
 KTTZ-FM in Lubbock, Texas
  in Little Rock, Arkansas
  in Tucson, Arizona
 KUFM (FM) in Missoula, Montana
 KUOR (FM) in Redlands, California
 KURU in Silver City, New Mexico
 KUYI-LP in Upper Moencopi, Arizona
 KVCS in Spring Valley, Minnesota
 KVDP (FM) in Dry Prong, Louisiana
  in Pierre, South Dakota
  in Montrose, Colorado
 KVNV in Sun Valley, Nevada
  in Springfield, Missouri
 KXGM in Hiawatha, Iowa
 KXLV in Amarillo, Texas
 KXPB-LP in Pacific Beach, Washington
  in Seminole, Oklahoma
 KYFP in Palestine, Texas
 WAKP in Smithboro, Georgia
  in Greensburg, Indiana
 WBCX in Gainesville, Georgia
 WBIB-FM in Forsyth, Georgia
 WBOI in Fort Wayne, Indiana
 WBSD in Burlington, Wisconsin
  in New Orleans, Louisiana
 WBSU in Brockport, New York
 WBUH in Brewster, Massachusetts
  in Hawley, Pennsylvania
  in Heathsville, Virginia
 WCOV-FM in Friendship, New York
  in Olive Hill, Tennessee
  in Auburn, New York
 WECV in Nashville, Tennessee
 WEMU in Ypsilanti, Michigan
  in Concord, New Hampshire
  in Teaneck, New Jersey
  in Lancaster, Pennsylvania
  in Panama City, Florida
 WGLT in Normal, Illinois
 WGMS (FM) in Hagerstown, Maryland
 WGZS in Cloquet, Minnesota
 WHAA in Adams, Wisconsin
  in Acton, Massachusetts
 WHYU-FM in Meyersdale, Pennsylvania
  in Kalamazoo, Michigan
 WIMB in Murphysboro, Illinois
  in Delaware, Ohio
  in Syracuse, New York
 WKCX in Crittenden, Kentucky
 WKEK in Gunflint Lake, Minnesota
  in Heflin, Alabama
  in Thompson, Ohio
 WKYG in Murray, Kentucky
  in Kissimmee, Florida
  in Montgomery, Alabama
  in Aiken, South Carolina
  in Bay City, Michigan
  in Lowell, Indiana
  in Forest, Mississippi
  in Schenectady, New York
 WNIA (FM) in Tarboro, North Carolina
 WNIE in Freeport, Illinois
  in New York, New York
 WNZN in Lorain, Ohio
 WOCG in Livingston, Tennessee
 WOFM (FM) in Alcoa, Tennessee
 WOKL in Round Lake Beach, Illinois
  in Naperville, Illinois
  in Cambridge, Ohio
  in Ironton, Ohio
  in Pascagoula, Mississippi
  in Warren, Michigan
 WPKT in Norwich, Connecticut
 WRLP in Orange, Virginia
 WRSM in Rising Sun, Maryland
  in State College, Pennsylvania
 WRYN in Hickory, North Carolina
 WSFX (FM) in Nanticoke, Pennsylvania
 WSMR (FM) in Sarasota, Florida
  in Cloverdale, Indiana
  in Platteville, Wisconsin
  in Gainesville, Florida
  in Springfield, Ohio
  in Mount Carmel, Illinois
 WVTF in Roanoke, Virginia
  in Cape May, New Jersey
 WWFM in Trenton, New Jersey
  in Cheriton, Virginia
  in Christiana, Delaware
  in Villanova, Pennsylvania
  in Radnor Township, Pennsylvania
  in Alcoa, Tennessee
 WYNS in Waynesville, Ohio
 WYTC-LP in Hyde Park, Vermont
 WZMV in Mohrsville, Pennsylvania

Lists of radio stations by frequency